In enzymology, a (S)-2-haloacid dehalogenase is an enzyme that catalyzes the chemical reaction

(S)-2-haloacid + HO  (R)-2-hydroxyacid + halide

Thus, the two substrates of this enzyme are (S)-2-haloacid and HO, whereas its two products are (R)-2-hydroxyacid and halide.

This enzyme belongs to the family of hydrolases, specifically those acting on halide bonds in carbon-halide compounds.  The systematic name of this enzyme class is (S)-2-haloacid halidohydrolase. Other names in common use include 2-haloacid dehalogenase[ambiguous], 2-haloacid halidohydrolase [ambiguous][ambiguous], 2-haloalkanoic acid dehalogenase, 2-haloalkanoid acid halidohydrolase, 2-halocarboxylic acid dehalogenase II, DL-2-haloacid dehalogenase[ambiguous], L-2-haloacid dehalogenase, and L-DEX.  This enzyme participates in gamma-hexachlorocyclohexane degradation and 1,2-dichloroethane degradation.

Structural studies

References

 
 
 
 
 
 
 
 
 

EC 3.8.1
Enzymes of known structure